The Western Rural and American Stockman (1883-1895) was a semi-weekly newspaper published in Chicago, Illinois. It published articles about agriculture, livestock, and farm life in the United States during the late 19th century. Its editor was Milton George. It was associated with the Farm, Field, and Fireside collective of newspapers.

References

External links 
 Illinois Digital Newspaper Collections: Western Rural and American Stockman (1879-1894)
 Chronicling America: The Western Rural and American Stockman

Defunct newspapers published in Chicago
Publications disestablished in 1895
Newspapers established in 1883
1883 establishments in Illinois
1895 disestablishments in Illinois